Impress Remote is an open-source presentation remote control app for LibreOffice on mobile devices. The client allows interacting with slideshow presentations from a mobile device, including slide previews, speaker notes, timer, stop watch, pointer, going directly to a given slide, blank screen and more (depending on the mobile version).

The Android version was developed mainly by Andrzej Hunt during the 2012 Google Summer of Code term. In February 2014, Impress Remote for /iPad was announced to be available in iTunes Store. The iOS version was developed mainly by Siqi Liu during the 2013 Google Summer of Code term.

In January 2015, an Impress Remote app for the Pebble smartwatch was unveiled.

See also 
 The Document Foundation

References

External links

  wiki
 Code repository
 Google Play
 
 Apple App Store

Free and open-source Android software